At the Academy Awards, the so-called "Big Five" awards are those for Best Picture, Best Director, Best Actor, Best Actress, and Best Screenplay (either Best Original Screenplay or Best Adapted Screenplay). As of the 94th Academy Awards (2021), a total of 43 films have been nominated in all five of these award categories. Only three films have won all five of these major awards: It Happened One Night (1934), One Flew Over the Cuckoo's Nest (1975), and The Silence of the Lambs (1991). Eight films failed to win any of the five major awards after being nominated in each category.

List of films 

This list of films is sorted by the number of Big Five Academy Awards received by each film.  Award winners are listed in bold with green background; others listed are nominees who did not win.

Milestones and records 

 David O. Russell, Billy Wilder, Elia Kazan, and Mike Nichols are the only directors with two movies on this list.
 Nine actors appear twice on this list as Best Actor nominees: Anthony Hopkins, Burt Lancaster, Clark Gable, Dustin Hoffman, Jack Nicholson, Montgomery Clift, Paul Newman, Warren Beatty and William Holden.
 Four actresses appear twice on this list as Best Actress nominees: Vivien Leigh, Elizabeth Taylor, Greer Garson and Diane Keaton. Faye Dunaway appears three times, while Katharine Hepburn appears four times.
 Billy Wilder, David O. Russell, and Claudine West are the only screenwriters with two screenplays on this list.
 Eight directors also wrote the screenplays of their movies: Billy Wilder, David O. Russell, Damien Chazelle, Anthony Minghella, George Seaton, Richard Brooks, Robert Rossen and William A. Wellman.
 Sylvester Stallone is credited for writing and acting in Rocky. Clint Eastwood is credited for directing and acting in Million Dollar Baby. Warren Beatty and Woody Allen were each credited for acting, writing, and directing their respective movies on the list.
 Network and From Here to Eternity each had six nominations in the "Big Five"; both extra nominations were for Best Actor.
 The ceremonies with the most "Big Five"-nominated films were the 40th and 54th with three films each. Other ceremonies with multiple "Big Five" nominees are the 12th, 13th, 24th, 47th, and 49th, each with two films.

Other films with 4 "Big Five" awards 

These films won all four of their nominations for the Big Five Academy Awards. The list is sorted chronologically.

Above-the-line awards 
List of films with the most "above-the-line" Academy Awards—that is, the "Big Five" + Supporting Acting. Everything Everywhere All at Once (2022) holds the record with six "above-the-line" awards, while eight other films have received five. The list is sorted chronologically.

See also 

 List of films with all four Academy Award acting nominations
 List of films with two or more Academy Awards in an acting category

Notes

References 

Big Five